Bleiswijk is a town and former municipality in the western Netherlands, in the province of South Holland.

Demographics
The municipality had a population of 10,222 in 2006, and covered an area of 21.96 km² (8.48 mile²) of which 0.83 km² (0.32 mile²) is water. On 1 January 2007, the town was merged with neighbouring towns Bergschenhoek and Berkel en Rodenrijs to form the new municipality Lansingerland.

According to the January 2020 census, its population was 10,895.

References

External links

location on map(OSM)
Het weer in Bleiswijk

Municipalities of the Netherlands disestablished in 2007
Populated places in South Holland
Former municipalities of South Holland
Lansingerland